Sean Bettenhausen (born January 5, 2003) is an American soccer player who plays as a midfielder for Penn State Nittany Lions.

Club career
Bettenhausen began his youth career with Philadelphia Union in 2016. He made his debut with the club's USL Championship affiliate side, Philadelphia Union II, on September 2, 2020. He appeared as a half-time substitute during a 2–1 loss to Atlanta United 2.

Career statistics

Club

Personal
His brother, David, played college soccer at Villanova University from 2016 to 2019.
He also has a sister, Katie.

References

External links
Philadelphia Union at the USSDA website

2003 births
Living people
American soccer players
Association football midfielders
Philadelphia Union II players
USL Championship players
Soccer players from Pennsylvania
Penn State Nittany Lions men's soccer players